Valtteri Pihlajamäki (born July 28, 1996) is a Finnish professional ice hockey right winger currently playing for Iisalmen Peli-Karhut in Mestis.

He made his Liiga debut for Ässät on October 27, 2016 against Sport and went on to play three games that season.

References

External links

1996 births
Living people
Ässät players
Finnish ice hockey right wingers
Iisalmen Peli-Karhut players
KeuPa HT players
Sportspeople from Satakunta